Debatte: Journal of Contemporary Central and Eastern Europe is a triannual peer-reviewed academic journal published by Routledge. It was established in 1993 as Debatte: Review of Contemporary German Affairs and obtained in current title in 2005, when it merged with Labour Focus on Eastern Europe. The editor-in-chief is Andrew Kilmister (Oxford Brookes University). The journal covers Central and Eastern European studies, with an emphasis on Germany.

External links

Triannual journals
Publications established in 1993
English-language journals
Taylor & Francis academic journals
European studies journals